North Yemen may refer to:
 Mutawakkilite Kingdom of Yemen (1918–1962)
 Yemen Arab Republic (1962–1990)